Cameron Park (born 6 July 1992) is a former professional footballer who last played for Whitby Town as a winger in 2016, having started his career at Middlesbrough.

Career 
Park's natural position is as a left winger, following on from Middlesbrough's former youth products, Stewart Downing and Adam Johnson. He was considered a bright prospect from Middlesbrough's academy. He signed a four-and-a-half year professional contract in December 2010. Park made his debut for Middlesbrough on 15 January 2011 as a substitute in a 4-0 away win over Bristol City.  On 23 August 2011 Park joined Championship rivals Barnsley on a three-month loan, making three appearances. Park scored his only goal for Boro on 28 August 2012, against Gillingham in Middlesbrough's 2-0 win in the League Cup, a chip in the 90th minute.

Park was selected by the Scotland national under-21 football team in August 2012.

On 27 February 2014, Park joined League One side Crewe Alexandra on a one-month loan.

Park was released from his contract with Middlesbrough on 16 May 2014. He subsequently played for his home town club, Marske United, then joined Whitby Town. He was released by Whitby in October 2016, but later had a trial with the same club, playing against Middlesbrough's under-23s in a pre-season friendly on 28 July 2018.

Career statistics

References

External links 
 

1992 births
Living people
Scottish footballers
Middlesbrough F.C. players
Barnsley F.C. players
Crewe Alexandra F.C. players
Marske United F.C. players
Whitby Town F.C. players
English Football League players
Scotland youth international footballers
English people of Scottish descent
People from Redcar and Cleveland
Scotland under-21 international footballers
Footballers from Yorkshire
Association football wingers